Grethe Fossli (born 21 December 1954 in Bærum) is a Norwegian politician for the Labour Party.

She was elected to the Norwegian Parliament from Akershus in 1993, and was re-elected on two occasions.

References

1954 births
Living people
Politicians from Oslo
Asker politicians
Labour Party (Norway) politicians
Members of the Storting
Women members of the Storting
21st-century Norwegian politicians
21st-century Norwegian women politicians
20th-century Norwegian politicians
20th-century Norwegian women politicians